is a former professional Japanese baseball player. He played as an outfielder for the Fukuoka SoftBank Hawks and the Yokohama DeNA BayStars.

External links

 NPB.com

1993 births
Living people
Baseball people from Shimane Prefecture
Japanese baseball players
Nippon Professional Baseball outfielders
Fukuoka SoftBank Hawks players
Yokohama DeNA BayStars players